Almavision is an American television network broadcasting Christian programming in Spanish with affiliates across North and Central America. The network is carried via satellite on Echostar and SatMex 5, their slogan is "Television Cristiana...a la manera de Dios. " ("Christian television... in God's way.") and "Comprometidos con la verdad" ("committed to the truth").

History
Almavision Television began broadcasting on December 28, 2002 as VidaVision on channel 25 in Los Angeles, California. In early 2003, they learned that there was another group in Florida using that name so they changed their name to Almavision (meaning "Soul Vision").

The network was founded by Juan "Bruno" Caamano. According to Caamano, "I was praying and meditating on the Word of God when I received an instruction from the Lord to establish a television ministry".

Affiliates
 KTAV-LD 35.1 Altadena/Los Angeles, California
 W31EZ-D 25.6 Arbury Hills, Illinois
 KHPK-LD 28.3 DeSoto, Texas
 KJJM-LD 34.3 Dallas/Fort Worth, Texas
 KUVM-LD 10.3 Missouri City/Houston, Texas
 KKPM-CD 28.10 Chico/Sacramento, California
 KTVP-LD 22.5 Phoenix, Arizona
 WEYS-LD 31.1 Miami/Fort Lauderdale, Florida
 KISA-LD 40.3 San Antonio, Texas
 KEGS-LD 30.2 Las Vegas, Nevada
 KTVS-LD 36.2 Albuquerque, New Mexico
 KWYT-LD 36.5 Yakima, Washington

References

External links
 Almavision 
 Almavision on Salmista.com 

Spanish-language television networks in the United States
Religious television stations in the United States
Television channels and stations established in 2002
2002 establishments in California